Double Take LLC, commonly referred to as Double Take Comics, was an American comic book publisher based in New York City. Founded by former Marvel Comics executive Bill Jemas as a subsidiary of Take-Two Interactive in October 2014, the company served as Take-Two Interactive's pilot project in comic book publishing. The company published five issues each from ten original comic book series, and was shut down in November 2016.

History 
Double Take Comics was founded by Bill Jemas, formerly President of Marvel Comics, as a subsidiary of video game company Take-Two Interactive. Jemas announced on December 20, 2013, that he was to preparing to launch a new comic book imprint with Take-Two Interactive, although a final direction had not yet been chosen. Take-Two Interactive had previously filed trademarks for possible names of the label, including Codex, Carante, and Double Take. Jemas settled on Double Take, and its opening was formally announced on October 30, 2014.

All comic book series published by Double Take were inspired by and set in an alternate reality of Night of the Living Dead. Jemas originally also considered creating comics on XCOM, BioShock and Civilization, three video game franchises owned by Take-Two Interactive, but could not come to terms with the respective game studios. He went Night of the Living Dead instead, seeing that the intellectual property was in the public domain, and because he felt like zombies were popular at the time. Jemas planned on distributing the comics digitally, through ComiXology and Madefire, and produce print versions later on.

The first issues of Double Take's first ten comic book series, namely Soul, Slab, Dedication, Rise, Medic, Honor, Spring, Home, Remote and Z-Men, were announced in March 2015. All ten first issues were released on September 16, 2015, with the release schedule being assisted by marketing coordinator Gabe Yocum. A movie adaptation of Z-Men, in cooperation with Lionsgate, was announced in October 2015. In February 2016, Double Take partnered with The Moth to bring more realism into their releases.

In September 2016, the company gave away 10,000 printed copies of their releases to visitors of the New York Comic Con. In October 2016, it was reported that Jemas was seeking  from private investors to purchase Double Take from Take-Two Interactive. Jemas initially denied the claim, stating "not even close", however, it was announced in November 2016 that the company was to close at the end of that month. Four spin-off series of their works, Z-Mart, Behold, 51 and Alphabet City, which were set to be released in December 2016, were never published.

Books published

References 

American companies established in 2014
Comic book publishing companies of the United States
Defunct comics and manga publishing companies
Defunct companies based in New York City
Mass media companies disestablished in 2016
Publishers of adult comics
Publishing companies established in 2014
Take-Two Interactive divisions and subsidiaries